The Xiaoshun or Little Shun River, in Zhejiang Province of East China, is one of the main tributaries of the Cao'e River (formerly Shun River). It was formerly called Little River (小江) or East Little River (东小江). The river has two sources: the South Creek (南溪) originates from Chitenggang (赤藤冈) in Zhuxi (竹溪), Shengzhou; and the North Creek originates in Jidong (稽东), Shaoxing County. The two streams join in Liangxi Township (两溪乡) to become Xiaoshun River, which then flows through Shangyu and joins the Cao'e River in Shangpu (上浦).

References

Rivers of Zhejiang
Shaoxing